Myer Strouse (December 16, 1825 – February 11, 1878) was a Democratic member of the U.S. House of Representatives from Pennsylvania.

Myer Strouse was born in Oberstrau, Bavaria, Germany to a Jewish family.  He immigrated to the United States in 1832 with his father, who settled in Pottsville, Pennsylvania.  He attended private schools and edited the North American Farmer in Philadelphia from  1848 to 1852.  He studied law, was admitted to the bar in 1855 and commenced practice in Pottsville.

Strouse was elected as a Democrat to the Thirty-eighth and Thirty-ninth Congresses.  He was not a candidate for renomination in 1866.  He resumed the practice of law, and was attorney and solicitor for the "Molly Maguires," a secret organization in the mining regions of Pennsylvania, in 1876 and 1877.  He died in Pottsville in 1878, and was buried in Odd Fellows Cemetery.

See also
List of Jewish members of the United States Congress

Sources

The Political Graveyard

1825 births
1878 deaths
Politicians from Pottsville, Pennsylvania
Bavarian emigrants to the United States
Jewish members of the United States House of Representatives
Democratic Party members of the United States House of Representatives from Pennsylvania
19th-century American politicians